Bowers House is a historic home located at Sugar Grove, Pendleton County, West Virginia. It was built in 1898, and is a large, -story Queen Anne style frame dwelling.  It features two asymmetrical polygonal towers, contrasting wood siding in a herringbone pattern, projecting gables and bays, and large brackets with contrasting color schemes.

It was listed on the National Register of Historic Places in 1985.

References

Houses on the National Register of Historic Places in West Virginia
Queen Anne architecture in West Virginia
Houses completed in 1898
Houses in Pendleton County, West Virginia
National Register of Historic Places in Pendleton County, West Virginia